Chotushkone is an Indian Bengali thriller film directed by Srijit Mukherji, starring Aparna Sen, Goutam Ghose, Chiranjeet Chakraborty, Parambrata Chatterjee and Payel Sarkar. The film received positive reviews from critics. Srijit Mukherji won the National Film Award for Best Direction at India's 62nd National Film Awards. The film was a both critically and commercially successful. At the time of 2014, when Bengali films is on ventilation, films like Bachchan and Game also were hits, but Chotushkone was ran for 50 days in major cities of Kolkata. The film was blockbuster at the box-office.

Synopsis
The movie begins with an unknown woman writing a suicide note and then hanging herself from a ceiling fan. A man is seen holding hands with a kid and staring at the hanging woman.
Then in black and white, portraying the past, we see a party at a bar as Nilanjana (Trina) and her cynical boyfriend Ritwick (Dipto) argue about parties and movies.
Then the movie starts in the present where Joy discusses about making a movie with a producer (Mr. Gupta). He calls Trina and tries to convince her to work alongside Shakyo, her ex-lover Dipto and him to make a movie of four short films. Shakyo and Dipto argue about films and then asks him to work with Trina. The four of them meet at Joy's house where he tells them that they have to go to Henry's island, Bakkhali to present their respective scripts to the producer, the common theme of their stories being death.
That evening, Shakyo and Dipto discuss their stories. Shakyo tells Dipto that he will pitch an old story he once wrote about a TV serial writer, who kills his characters in a brutal way, suffers from a heart attack on seeing his dead characters, and dies.
On their journey to Bakkhali, Trina and Joy discuss about Dipto's downfall. Dipto talks on the phone and barely misses an accident and finds his plot. He tells the story of a man who is a cigarette addict and gets run over by a car when he goes out to buy cigarettes at midnight.
Their car breaks down and they take shelter in a bungalow that belongs to Mr. Gupta. Trina tells her story where a dead woman calls on the spirits of alive people by planchette.
Next morning, Joy tells them the story of his brother who lost his mind, and his wife who died because Trina, Dipto and Shakyo abandoned his brother's movie due to their differences. He intends to kill them: sits them across a table and plays Russian roulette. However, the gun accidentally misses Trina and hits Joy. He dies.
The movie ends as Trina and Dipto go to meet Joy's brother (Mr. Gupta) in a mental hospital where he cannot recognise them.

Cast
 Aparna Sen as Trina Sen
 Chiranjeet Chakraborty as Dipto
 Goutam Ghose as Sakyo
 Parambrata Chatterjee as Joyobroto alias Joy
 Kaushik Ganguly as Mr. Gupta, a film producer
 Payel Sarkar as Nilanjana
 Ritabhari Chakraborty as a student
 Indrasish Roy as Ritwick
 Dhritiman Chatterjee as Trina's Husband 
 Rahul Banerjee as Amitava
 Barun Chanda as Moloy Sen ,Trina's Husband
 Arpita Pal as Jyotsna Mukherjee
 Debolina Dutta as Sonia 
 Koneenica Banerjee as Mimi 
 Sujan Mukhyopadhyay as Rajkumar Mukherjee
 Biswajit Chakraborty as a furniture dealer
 Shantilal Mukherjee as Police Officer
 Raajhorshee De as Film Maker

Awards

62nd National Film Awards 
Best Direction - Srijit Mukherji
Best Original Screenplay - Srijit Mukherji
Best Cinematography - Sudeep Chatterjee

Music
The music of the film has been composed by Anupam Roy. He himself has penned the lyrics (apart from one Rabindra Sangeet i.e. Chirosakha He). The Background Music is composed by Indraadip Dasgupta

References

External links
 

Bengali-language Indian films
2010s Bengali-language films
2014 films
Films scored by Anupam Roy
Films set in Kolkata
Films set in West Bengal
Films whose director won the Best Director National Film Award
Films whose cinematographer won the Best Cinematography National Film Award
Films whose writer won the Best Original Screenplay National Film Award
Films directed by Srijit Mukherji